Jeong Mi (born July 27, 1970) is a South Korean sprint canoer who competed in the late 1980s. She was eliminated in the semifinals of the K-4 500 m event at the 1988 Summer Olympics in Seoul.

External links
Sports-reference.com profile

1970 births
Canoeists at the 1988 Summer Olympics
Living people
Olympic canoeists of South Korea
South Korean female canoeists
Place of birth missing (living people)